Williams Lea Group Limited, branded Williams Lea Tag, is a global company that offers business process outsourcing (BPO) to large companies. Founded in 1820 as a company providing printing services to the financial industry, Williams Lea went through a number of changes to its business model and now provides services including mail processing, bulk mailing, printing, and page layout.

The German postal and logistics company Deutsche Post bought a majority stake in the company in 2006. Deutsche Post sold Williams Lea Tag to Advent International in 2017.

Williams Lea purchased the design and production agency Tag Worldwide in 2011, and adopted the company's name into its own brand.

Advent International completed its purchase of Williams Lea Tag from Deutsche Post DHL Group in December 2017 and appointed David Kassler as group chief executive of the business.

History
Williams Lea was founded in 1820 by John Wertheimer, who opened a printing business in London.

Williams Lea Tag has undergone rapid expansion in recent years due to the rise in corporate outsourcing of support functions. Growth has largely been organic, but it has made several acquisitions:
In October 2004, it acquired U.S.-based Bowne Business Solutions, a long-term joint venture partner, from Bowne & Co. for $190.8 million.
In August 2005, it acquired U.S.-based Uniscribe for $36.1 million and Australia-based Creatis for $7.7 million.
In November 2006, it acquired UK-based The Stationery Office for £130 million.
In 2007, Deutsche Post rebranded its German service lines document management, transactional print, mailroom services, and direct marketing/fulfillment as Williams Lea Deutschland. These service lines were re-integrated into Deutsche Post in 2010. Currently Williams Lea in Germany offers marketing solutions and presentation services.
In November 2007, Deutsche Post acquired legal process outsourcing (LPO) company Centric LPO for an undisclosed sum.
On July 12, 2011, Williams Lea purchased the design and production agency Tag Worldwide for an undisclosed sum.
 On August 24, 2017, WilliamsLeaTag is acquired by Advent International, a private equity company and domain name wltadvent.com redirects to wlt.com

References

External links
 

Business services companies of England
Privately held companies based in London
1820 establishments in England
Business services companies established in 1820
British companies established in 1820